Tipton Peak is a  summit located in Elko County, Nevada, United States.

Description
Tipton Peak is set along the crest of the Ruby Mountains which are a subset of the Great Basin Ranges. This peak is set within the Ruby Mountains Wilderness which is managed by the Humboldt–Toiyabe National Forest. Precipitation runoff from the mountain's west slope drains to South Fork Humboldt River via Smith and Huntington Creeks, whereas the east slope drains to Franklin Lake in Ruby Valley. This landform's toponym has been officially adopted by the U.S. Board on Geographic Names.

Climate
Tipton Peak is set within the Great Basin Desert which has hot summers and cold winters. The desert is an example of a cold desert climate as the desert's elevation makes temperatures cooler than lower elevation deserts. Due to the high elevation and aridity, temperatures drop sharply after sunset. Summer nights are comfortably cool. Winter highs are generally above freezing, and winter nights are bitterly cold, with temperatures often dropping well below freezing. Alpine climate characterizes the summit and upper slopes.

See also
 List of mountain peaks of Nevada
 Great Basin

References

External links
 Weather forecast: Tipton Peak
 National Geodetic Survey Data Sheet

Mountains of Elko County, Nevada
Mountains of Nevada
North American 3000 m summits
Mountains of the Great Basin
Humboldt–Toiyabe National Forest